Caroline Pidcock is an Australian architect and a prominent advocate for sustainable development, based in Sydney, New South Wales.

Biography 
Pidcock is a campaigner for environmental and community issues. Her commitment led to her standing as an independent candidate for the Legislative Council in the 2007 New South Wales state election and appointment as an ambassador for the Al Gore Climate Change and 1 Million Women initiatives – a movement of women and girls fighting climate change by taking practical action.

More recently, Pidcock has been an active voice in the Millers Point Residents Action Group, campaigning to retain public housing in Millers Point and Dawes Point. She is also currently a member of the Sacred Heart Education Ministry and the South Australian Forestry Industry Advisory Boards. Previously she has also held presidential roles with the New South Wales and National Councils of the Royal Australian Institute of Architects, and the Australian Sustainable Built Environment Council; Chaired the Carriageworks and Living Future Institute of Australia Boards; has been a member of the New South Wales Architects Registration and Bicycle New South Wales Boards; representative for the industry on the Australian Building Codes Board and held adjunct roles at several New South Wales based universities.

Pidcock's sustained leadership in built environment sector led to her appointment as a Life Fellow of the Royal Australian Institute of Architects in 2006.

In July 2011, Pidcock was awarded the prestigious Marion Mahony Griffin Award by the Australian Institute of Architects in recognition of her contribution to architecture in New South Wales.

As part of the centenary of Canberra celebrations, Pidcock delivered the ‘Magic of Australia – with regards to the Griffins‘ lecture for the Walter Burley Griffin Society's annual Marion Mahony Griffin Lecture.

Personal life 
Pidcock was born in Grafton, New South Wales, on the Clarence River. Her family moved to Mosman when she was three, and attended the Blessed Sacrament Clifton Gardens school throughout primary years, before attending high school at Kincoppal Rose Bay.

In November 2012, Pidcock married the former City of Sydney councillor and Deputy Lord Mayor, Architect and Planner, John Mcinerney; chair of the Millers Point Residents Action Group.

Education 
Pidcock graduated from the University of Sydney in 1987 with a Bachelor of Architecture (Hons). She worked for Alex Popov while she was studying.

Career 
Following her graduation, Pidcock worked in London with Jestico + Whiles , before returning to Australia to work briefly in the office of Connybeare Morrison, and then for two years with Grose Bradley before establishing Pidcock –Architecture and Sustainability in 1992.

Pidcock served as New South Wales Chapter President and national director of the Australian Institute of Architects for a period of three years, during which time she developed an effective profile with media and government to promote a wider interest in architecture, design and urban affairs.

In November 2009, Pidcock was awarded a Byera Hadley Travelling Scholarship to investigate "The Architecture of Zero Emissions Housing" to investigate how this might impact the technical and design approaches of the practice. Extending the ideas of this research led her to the Living Building Challenge where she joined the Board, and in 2013 established and chaired the Living Futures Institute Australia (LFIA). As a result of her contribution, Pidcock was recognised as a "Living Building Hero" by the International Living Future Institute in 2014.

In 2013, Smart Company named Pidcock one of five women set to disrupt the industries for her work to produce kit homes following the receipt of a Commercialisation Australia grant, in November 2013, to assist in the commercialisation of a new system in conjunction with Origination | &U.

Boards and Committees 
 2012–  Living Futures Institute of Australia Boards
 2012–2014 Chair of Carriageworks, Eveleigh, New South Wales
 2012–2015 South Australian Forestry Industry Advisory Board 
 2005–2008 President of the Australian Sustainable Built Environment Council
 2002–2005 President New South Wales and National Councillor of the Royal Australian Institute of Architects
 2003–2011 Industry Representative on the Australian Building Codes Board
 1998–2009 Member of the New South Wales Architects Registration Board
 2012–2014 Member of Greening Australia New South Wales
 2007–2009 Bicycle New South Wales Board

Awards 
 2000 Winner Design Award for New Building for Saines House, Manly Council
 2002 Department of Public Works and Services Award for achievement as a business woman NAWIC
 2004 Blackett Award for the Shellharbour Workers Club (in association with Richard Goodwin), Australian Institute of Architects
 2008 Winner Small Commercial Sustainability Award for Resource 88, Building Product News
 2008 Highly Commended Single Dwelling (Alterations & Extensions) Sustainability Award for Stanmore House, Building Product News
 2009 Byera Hadley Travelling Scholarship, New South Wales Architects Registration Board
 2011 Marion Mahony Griffin Prize, Australian Institute of Architects 
 2011 Highly Commended Single Dwelling (New) Sustainability Award for Rose Bay Eco Challenge House, Building Product News
 2011 Winner Insurance Council Australia's resilient house competition with Bluescope Steel
 2011 Third Insurance Council Australia's resilient house competition with House of Parts
 2012 Shortlisted Women of Style – Design section
 2013 Finalist Timber Design Awards Multi Residential – New Buildings Category

References
EXTERNAL LINKS 

 Cheng, Linda, Caroline Pidcock, Ken Maher, Belinda Allwood, Ellen Buttrose, Paul Toyne, Jefa Greenaway, et al. “A Sustainable Future Starts Now : Architects Are, to Varying Degrees, Changing Their Processes and Priorities to Create More Sustainable Designs. But It Can Be Difficult to Get Clients and Others on Board. Here, Members of the Profession Explain­ How They Are Approaching This Issue and Discuss the Best Ways to Move the Industry Forward.” Architecture Australia 109, no. 3 (May 1, 2020): 58–63.
 Lahoud, Adrian. “Parasite and Machine [Shellharbour Workers’ Club].” Architecture Australia 93, no. 2 (March 1, 2004): 38–39.
 Pidcock, Caroline. “Photosynthesis.” Architecture Australia 85, no. 5 (September 1996): 76.

Australian women architects
Living people
21st-century Australian architects
20th-century Australian architects
New South Wales architects
Year of birth missing (living people)
20th-century Australian women
21st-century Australian women